John Eugene Harding (June 27, 1877 – July 26, 1959) was a businessman and one-term member of the United States House of Representatives from Ohio from 1907 to 1909.

Early life and career 
Harding was born in Excello, Ohio, the son of paper manufacturer Abram E. Harding and his wife Christine. He attended the public schools in nearby Amanda Village, and the Pennsylvania Military Academy at Chester. He graduated from the University of Michigan.

He engaged in business and industrial enterprises in Middletown, Ohio, including the family paper business, Harding Paper Company, which had a mill at Excello.

Congress 
He was elected member of the Ohio Senate in 1902. In 1906 he was elected as a Republican to the Sixtieth Congress from Ohio's Third District. He was defeated as an independent candidate in 1908. He was a delegate to the Republican State convention in 1910.

Later career and death 
Retiring from public service, he engaged in the paper business in Chicago, Illinois, until he moved to New York City, where he was associated with the Pure Oil Co. from 1921 to 1926. He engaged in industrial enterprises until he retired in 1949.

Harding died in New Haven, Connecticut, aged 82. He was interred in Woodside Cemetery, Middletown, Ohio.

References

1877 births
1959 deaths
American manufacturing businesspeople
Papermakers
People from Middletown, Ohio
University of Michigan alumni
Republican Party Ohio state senators
People from Butler County, Ohio
Republican Party members of the United States House of Representatives from Ohio